Les Escaldes or Escaldes is an urban area in Escaldes-Engordany parish, Andorra. It is located near the nation's capital, Andorra la Vella.

Overview
The hot springs were known by the Romans who used them for medical purposes.

There was a textile industry from the Middle Ages, producing woven fabrics and umbrellas in several guilds. The area is also known for its traditional dance, the Santa Anna.

In the 1800s some proposed establishing baths to take advantage of the natural hot springs, but there was resistance from the government of Les Escaldes, possibly for fear that visitors to the hot springs would bring diseases to Andorra.

Nowadays Les Escaldes is home to the spa resort Caldea.

Education

The Spanish international primary school Escuela Española de Escaldes serves the community.

Climate

References

External links

Populated places in Andorra
Escaldes-Engordany